As of April 2022 IrAero operates the following services:

References

IrAero